The Europe Top 16, also known as the Europe Top 16 Cup and previously known as the Europe Top 12, is a table tennis tournament organised annually by the European Table Tennis Union (ETTU), featuring the highest-ranked players in Europe.

History

The first event was held in 1971 in Zadar, Yugoslavia (now part of Croatia) as an experimental classification tournament. Twelve male players and six female players took part, with István Jónyer and Beatrix Kisházi, both from Hungary, winning the inaugural men's and women's competitions respectively. The tournament would go on to be held each year in different venues, and would become known as the Europe Top 12.

From 1971 until 1989, the tournament used a round-robin format; all players played each other once, with the champion being the player who accumulated the most wins. From 1990, there was a change of format; the twelve players were divided into two round-robin groups, with the top two players from each group progressing to semi-finals, followed by a final. At the 2001 tournament the twelve players were divided into four groups for the first time, with the group winners qualifying for the semi-finals, and from 2002 it was decided that the top two players from each group would qualify for quarter-finals, with knockout rounds to decide the winner. From 2015, the number of players qualifying for both the men's and women's events was increased to 16, and the tournament's name was changed to the Europe Top 16.

Sweden's Jan-Ove Waldner is the most successful player in the history of the men's event, winning the tournament seven times and finishing runner-up on a further four occasions between 1984 and 1996. Beatrix Kisházi of Hungary and Li Jiao of the Netherlands share the record for most wins in the women's event, with four wins each. Kisházi won the first three editions of the tournament from 1971 to 1973 and regained the title in 1977, while Li's four title wins came between 2007 and 2011.

Qualification

Since 2019, the 16 participants in both the men's and the women's tournaments qualify as follows:

 The current European Champion.
 14 additional players based on the European rankings at the time, subject to a maximum of two players from any association.
 One player from the host nation. If a player from the host nation has already qualified by right, the next eligible player in the rankings will qualify.

Format

Since 2018, the format of the tournament has been a knockout played over two days. The semi-final losers play off for third and fourth place. The top three players in both the men's and the women's tournaments will be guaranteed a place at the Table Tennis World Cup, subject to a maximum of two players from any association.

Results

Men

Women

Statistics

Multiple champions

Listed below are the players who have won the tournament on two or more occasions.

Men

Women

All-time medal table

See also

 Asian Cup
 PanAm Cup
 European Table Tennis Championships
 International Table Tennis Federation

References

External links
 European Table Tennis Union
 International Table Tennis Federation

 
Table tennis competitions
European international sports competitions
Recurring sporting events established in 1971